Church of St. Nicholas in Jagodnjak is Serbian Orthodox church in eastern Croatia. The church was built in 1725. Church gain attention in 2012 when local believer claimed apparation of Nectarios of Aegina in her dream. In 2013 special place in church with saint's icon was built, and pilgrimage to Aegina was organized. In 2015 Eparchy of Osječko polje and Baranja initiated building of smaller church dedicated to Nectarios of Aegina.

See also
Eparchy of Osječko polje and Baranja
Jagodnjak
Serbs of Croatia
List of Serbian Orthodox churches in Croatia

References

Jagodnjak